Losta is a river in Vologodsky District, Vologda Oblast, Russia. It is 38 kilometres long, and starts from Lezha river near Kraskovo, ends by flowing back into Lezha.

Rural localities 
The rural localities (villages) located on Losta are:
 Golenevo
 Konyukhovo
 Kishkino

References 

Rivers of Vologda Oblast